Lamprozela desmophanes is a moth of the Heliozelidae family. It was described by Edward Meyrick in 1922. It is found in India.

References

Moths described in 1922
Heliozelidae